Panju may refer to:
 Panju Island, an island in the Vasai Creek, near Mumbai
 Panju (actor), Indian actor